"How Some Children Played at Slaughtering" (German: Wie Kinder Schlachtens miteinander gespielt haben, also translated as "How children played slaughtering together") is a set of two short and rather gruesome anecdotes from Grimm's Fairy Tales. It was removed from the book in the second edition, and is missing from most modern editions as well.

Synopsis 
 Part One
 In a city named Franecker, located in West Friesland, a group of young children (around 5 or 6 years of age) once played at being a butcher, a cook, a cook's assistant, etc., and killed the child who played as "the pig". The child who played as "the butcher" was arrested and charged for murder, but the town council (which also functioned as a court), never having had such a case before it, was unsure whether to punish such a young child. An old, wise councilor finally came up with a special method to decide if the child was guilty or not. He brought a ripe, appetizing apple and a high-value gold coin, took one in each hand and let the child choose one of them. If "the butcher" chose the apple (presumably proving that the child still had a completely naive mind), then he was innocent, and would be free to go; if he chose the gold coin (presumably proving that a more abstract understanding of values had already developed in the child), the child was guilty, and would be hanged for murder. "The butcher" chose the apple without any hesitation. Therefore, he was released and all charges were dropped.

 Part Two
 One day, two brothers saw their father killing off a pig. They imitated what they saw and the older brother killed his younger brother. Their mother, who was giving the baby a bath, heard her child scream and abandoned the baby in the bath.  When she saw what her eldest child had done, she took the knife out of her younger son's throat, and in her rage stabbed her older son in the heart. When the mother found out that meanwhile the baby had drowned in the tub, she felt an inconsolable desperation and committed suicide by hanging herself. After a long day of work in the field, the father came home. Finding out that his whole family was dead, he soon also died from sadness.

The first recension is copied out of an old book in the Berliner Abendblättern von Kleist (1810. No. 39.). The second is found Martin Zeilers Miscell. Nürnberg 1661. P. 388. who took it from J. Wolf Lectiones Memorabiles. Laving. 1600. folio.

See also
Mens rea

References

External links 
"How Some Children Played at Slaughtering" on the Internet Archive 

Grimms' Fairy Tales
Child characters in fairy tales
Fiction about murder
Fiction about familicide
Filicide in fiction
Fratricide in fiction
Fiction about suicide